Peemvit Thongnitiroj is a professional footballer from Thailand. He is currently playing for Uthai Thani in Thai League 3 as a left midfielder.

Honours

Club
Uthai Thani
Thai League 3 (1): 2021–22
Thai League 3 Northern Region (1): 2021–22

References

External links
 
 https://www.siamsport.co.th/player/334166/peemvit-thongnitiroj
 https://globalsportsarchive.com/people/soccer/peemvit-thongnitiroj/191044/

1993 births
Living people
Peemvit Thongnitiroj
Association football midfielders
Peemvit Thongnitiroj
Peemvit Thongnitiroj
Peemvit Thongnitiroj
Samutsongkhram F.C. players
Peemvit Thongnitiroj
Peemvit Thongnitiroj